The 2015 Stanley Cup Finals was the championship series of the National Hockey League's (NHL)  season, and the culmination of the 2015 Stanley Cup playoffs. The Western Conference champion Chicago Blackhawks defeated the Eastern Conference champion Tampa Bay Lightning four games to two to win their sixth championship in franchise history, and their third title in six seasons.

The Lightning, as the club with the better regular-season record, held home-ice advantage in the series. The best-of-seven series was played in a 2–2–1–1–1 format, with Tampa Bay hosting Game 1, 2, and 5; and Chicago hosting Games 3, 4, and 6.  Tampa Bay would have hosted Game 7 had it been needed.  The series started June 3 and ended on June 15.

Tyler Johnson and Patrick Kane led the Stanley Cup playoffs in points scored with 23 points each.

Paths to the Finals

Tampa Bay Lightning

Since their win in 2004, the Lightning had lost in the Conference Finals in 2011 in seven games to the Boston Bruins. The Lightning were eliminated in the first round in 2006, 2007, and 2014.

The Lightning entered the 2014–15 season with major re-signings during the offseason including centre Tyler Johnson, wingers Ryan Callahan and Ondrej Palat, and goalie Ben Bishop. In free agency, Tampa Bay picked up centre Brian Boyle and defenceman Anton Stralman from the New York Rangers and Brenden Morrow from the St. Louis Blues. The team made two trades to bolster the defence, picking up Jason Garrison at the 2014 draft and Braydon Coburn just before the 2015 trade deadline.

Tampa Bay compiled 108 points (50–24–8) during the regular season to finish in second place in the Atlantic Division. Centre and team captain Steven Stamkos finished second in goal-scoring during the regular season with 43 goals. Earlier in the season, Head Coach Jon Cooper nicknamed the team's second line of Johnson, Palat and winger Nikita Kucherov as the "Triplets" because they were so in sync; at the mid-season in January, the three players led the League in plus-minus.

In the playoffs, the Lightning eliminated the Detroit Red Wings in seven games, the Montreal Canadiens in six games, and the New York Rangers in the Conference Finals in seven games. They became the first post-1967 expansion team to beat three Original Six teams on the way to the Stanley Cup Finals and the only team in NHL history to face an Original Six team at every stage of the playoffs.

Chicago Blackhawks

This was the team's 13th appearance overall, and they were seeking their sixth overall Cup championship.

The Blackhawks entered the 2014 offseason after being eliminated in the Conference Finals in seven games by the eventual  Cup champion Los Angeles Kings. Major free agent acquisitions during the offseason included centre Brad Richards and winger Daniel Carcillo from the Rangers. Approaching the NHL trade deadline in early March, Chicago traded for defenceman Kimmo Timonen from the Philadelphia Flyers, centre Antoine Vermette from the Arizona Coyotes, and centre Andrew Desjardins from the San Jose Sharks.

Chicago finished in third place in the Central Division, earning 102 points (48–28–6). Goalie Corey Crawford tied the Canadiens' Carey Price as the William M. Jennings Trophy recipient for allowing a league-low 189 goals during the regular season.

In the playoffs, the Blackhawks eliminated the Nashville Predators in six games, swept the Minnesota Wild, and defeated the Anaheim Ducks in the Conference Finals in seven games.

Game summaries
 Number in parenthesis represents the player's total goals or assists to that point of the entire four rounds of the playoffs

Game 1

In Game 1, Tampa Bay struck first with a deflected goal by Alex Killorn at 4:31 in the first period. The Lightning nursed the lead into the third period with a strong conservative defensive effort, but Teuvo Teravainen and Antoine Vermette scored 118 seconds apart to win the game 2–1 for the Blackhawks. By assisting on Vermette's goal, Teravainen became the second-youngest player (at 20 years and 265 days) in NHL history, after Jaromir Jagr had two assists in Game 1 of the  Finals (on May 15, 1991, at 19 years and 89 days), to have a multi-point game in the Stanley Cup final.

Game 2

Jason Garrison's power play goal at 8:49 of the third period proved to be the difference in Tampa Bay's victory in Game 2. Lightning starting goaltender Ben Bishop had left the game moments earlier for reasons that were undisclosed at the time, but was later revealed to be a torn groin. He was replaced with Andrei Vasilevskiy who was credited with his first playoff victory. He also became the first goalie to win a Stanley Cup Finals game in relief of an injured starter since Lester Patrick helped the New York Rangers defeat the Montreal Maroons in overtime of Game 2 of the 1928 Stanley Cup Finals, 2–1.

Game 3

The series moved to Chicago for Game 3. There was some debate who would start for Tampa Bay, but regular starter Ben Bishop started the game for Tampa Bay. For the third time in a row, Tampa Bay struck first, on Ryan Callahan's slapshot goal at 5:09 of the first. Brad Richards tied it up on a power-play goal and the teams were tied after the first period. The first period was dominated by Chicago, who outshot Tampa Bay 19–7. The second period was dominated by Tampa Bay, which outshot Chicago 17–7, but there was no scoring. In the third period, Brandon Saad gave Chicago its first lead at 4:14, but Tampa Bay countered on the next shift on a goal by Ondrej Palat to tie the score once again. Late in the third period, Victor Hedman led a rush down ice for Tampa Bay and passed to Cedric Paquette who scored to put the Lightning ahead again. The Lightning were able to defend their lead to win the game 3–2 and take a series lead two games to one.

Game 4

The Lightning chose to rest injured goaltender Ben Bishop for Game 4 in favor of rookie Andrei Vasilevskiy. The Lightning protected Vasilevskiy with tight defensive play, allowing only two shots by the Blackhawks in the first period, which was scoreless. For the first time in the series, the Blackhawks scored the first goal, on a goal by Jonathan Toews at 6:40 of the second. Alex Killorn tied it for the Lightning at 11:47 and the game was tied 1–1 after two periods. In the third, the Blackhawks' Brandon Saad muscled his way to the goal and scored on a backhand past Vasilevskiy at 6:22 to put the Blackhawks ahead. The game's pace picked up as the Lightning tried to tie the score but the Blackhawks goaltender Corey Crawford made several outstanding saves to shut out Tampa Bay the rest of the way. The win tied the series at two games apiece. It was the first time since  that the first four Stanley Cup Finals games were all decided by one goal.

Game 5

The series returned to Tampa for Game 5 and Ben Bishop returned to the net for the Lightning. The Blackhawks scored first for the second consecutive game, this time on a miscue by Bishop and Lightning defenceman Victor Hedman. The two collided and Patrick Sharp skated to the empty net with the puck, scoring at 6:11 of the first, a lead they held until 10:53 of the second when Valtteri Filppula scored to tie the score 1–1. The teams were tied going into the third, but Antoine Vermette scored for the Blackhawks at 2:00 of third and the lead held up as the Blackhawks played tight defence the rest of the way. The Blackhawks took the lead in the series three games to two, to give themselves a chance to win the Cup at home, something the franchise has not done since . For the second time in Finals history and the first since , wherein all five games that had to be played went to overtime, all games of the series through Game 5 have been decided by one goal, with neither team leading by more than one goal.

Game 6

In Game 6, the teams were scoreless after the first period. In the first period, Steven Stamkos put a shot off the crossbar and was stopped on a breakaway early in the second by Corey Crawford but it was the Blackhawks who scored first on a goal by Duncan Keith on a rebound of his own shot near the end of the second period to put Chicago ahead 1–0 after two periods. In the third period, the Blackhawks' Patrick Kane scored on a pass from Brad Richards and play by Brandon Saad to put the 'Hawks ahead 2–0, the first two-goal lead of the series. The Blackhawks then frustrated the Lightning the rest of the way to win the game 2–0, a shutout for Crawford and the Stanley Cup championship. It was revealed after the game that the Lightning's goaltender Ben Bishop had played with a torn groin muscle since Game 2 and Tyler Johnson was playing with a fractured wrist, injured in Game 1. This was also the first time since 1938, when they beat the Toronto Maple Leafs in the fourth game of a best-of-five Finals at Chicago Stadium, and the first time at the United Center that the Blackhawks won the Stanley Cup on home ice.

Team rosters

Chicago Blackhawks

Tampa Bay Lightning

Stanley Cup engraving
The 2015 Stanley Cup was presented to Blackhawks captain Jonathan Toews by NHL Commissioner Gary Bettman following the Blackhawks' 2–0 win over the Lightning in Game 6. 

The following Blackhawks players and staff had their names engraved on the Stanley Cup

2014–15 Chicago Blackhawks

Engraving notes
 #80 Antoine Vermette played 63 games for Arizona, 13 for Chicago, and 20 of 23 playoff games and played in the Final (qualified for playing in the finals)
 #11 Andrew Desjardins played 56 games for San Jose, 13 for Chicago, and 21 of 23 playoff games, and played in the Final (qualified for playing in the finals)
 #57 Trevor van Riemsdyk – only played 18 games due to fractured patella, played eight games for Rockford (AHL), injured playing in the minors (Wrist) – played four games in the Final (qualified for playing in the finals)
 #86 Teuvo Teravainen – played 34 games for Chicago, and 39 games for Rockford (AHL), played 18 of 23 playoffs and played in the Final (qualified for playing in the finals)
 #44 Kimmo Timonen played 16 games for Chicago. Traded to Chicago from Philadelphia Feb 27, 2015. He did not play for Flyers this season due to a blood clot. Dressed for Game 6 of the Final (qualified for playing in the finals)
 #26 Kyle Cumiskey – played seven games for Chicago, played nine playoff games (qualified for playing seven Conference Finals games and two games in the Finals).
 #13 Daniel Carcillo – included because of injuries, spent the whole season with Chicago only 39 games played, not dressed in the playoffs - with Chicago request.
 #42 Joakim Nordstrom – played 38 games for Chicago, 23 games for Rockford, played three playoff games, included for playing in one game in the Conference Final – with Chicago request.
Scotty Bowman won his 14th Stanley Cup 1973, 1976, 1977, 1978, 1979 (Montreal), 1991, 1992 (Pittsburgh), 1997, 1998, 2002, 2008 (Detroit), 2010, 2013, 2015 (Chicago).
Left off the Stanley Cup
 #31 Antti Raanta – played 14 games, and was dressed in 51 games for Chicago. He also played 11 games for Rockford(AHL). Raanta was sent to the minors on February 22, 2015, when Scott Darling was recalled. Raanta rejoined Chicago on April 12 but did not dress in the playoffs. Chicago did not request his name, so it was not included on the Cup since Raanta had spent time playing in the minors after the trading deadline.
D. J. Kogut (Equipment Asst.), Jeff Uyenko (Equipment Asst.) – all three were included in the team picture.
Clinton Reif (Asst. Equipment Manager) who died on December 21 was also left off. Reif is on the Cup with Chicago in 2010 and 2013.

Television
In the U.S., the Finals were split between NBC and NBCSN, called by NBC Sports' lead commentary team of Mike Emrick, Eddie Olczyk, and Pierre McGuire; it was originally announced that games two and three were to be broadcast by NBCSN, with the rest on NBC. Game 2 was moved to NBC to serve as a lead-out for its coverage of the 2015 Belmont Stakes in favor of Game 4 on NBCSN. As Olczyk was also a contributor to NBC's Belmont coverage, he missed Game 2.

In Canada, all six games were broadcast by CBC Television (through Hockey Night in Canada, as produced by Sportsnet through a brokerage agreement) in English, TVA Sports in French, and Omni Television in Punjabi. These were the first Stanley Cup Finals under Rogers Communications' exclusive national broadcast rights to the NHL in Canada.

This was the second-most watched Stanley Cup Finals on U.S. television since 1995, trailing only the 2013 Stanley Cup Finals, with an average 3.2 Nielsen rating and 5.6 million viewers on NBC and NBCSN. Game 6 was seen by 7.6 million viewers nationally on NBC. Ratings for Game 6 were especially strong in Chicago and Tampa Bay: it was the most-watched NHL broadcast locally in Chicago history, and the second-highest in Tampa Bay. By contrast, ratings in Canada dropped significantly, making it the lowest-rated Stanley Cup Final since 2009. Game 6, facing competition from a Team Canada match in the 2015 FIFA Women's World Cup, and the Toronto Blue Jays (which had seen increased ratings due to a long winning streak), was the lowest-rated deciding NHL playoff game on Canadian television since the 2003 Stanley Cup Finals.

References

Navigation

Stanley Cup Finals
 
Chicago Blackhawks games
Tampa Bay Lightning games
2010s in Chicago
2015 in Illinois
Stanley Cup Finals
21st century in Tampa, Florida
Stanley Cup Finals
Stanley Cup Finals
Ice hockey competitions in Tampa, Florida
Stanley Cup Finals
Ice hockey competitions in Chicago